Sebahat Tuncel (born 5 July 1975) is a Turkish politician of Kurdish origin, women's rights advocate, former nurse and member of the Parliament in Turkey. She was elected a member of parliament while being in prison.

Early life and education 
She was born in Yazıhan and studied cartography and land surveying in Mersin University, before beginning her political career through the Women's Branch of the People's Democracy Party (HADEP) in 1998. After she was involved in the foundation of the Democratic Society Party (DTP), she became the spokesperson of its women's assembly. Subsequently she was the vice co-chairperson and Istanbul deputy of the DTP, She has also worked with international organizations such as United Nations Development Programme (UNDP) and Amnesty International (AI).

Political career 
She was arrested on 5 November 2006 for alleged membership in the PKK. But after she ran as an independent candidate within the Thousand Hopes alliance for the parliamentary elections from prison and after winning a seat in Istanbul with 93,000 votes, she was released from custody in July 2007. She was elected to the Grand National Assembly of Turkey from prison to the surprise of many. In the parliamentary election of 2011, she was an independent candidate to parliament supported by the Labor, Democracy and Freedom Block, and was elected as an MP for Istanbul's first electoral district. After her election she led a movement which criticized the fact that Hatip Dicle was not allowed to assume his seat in parliament even though he was elected. In 2013 she was elected co-chair of the HDP together with Ertuğrul Kürkçü. In May 2016 she was elected co-chair of the Democratic Regions Party (DBP) together with Kamuran Yüksek. As by September 2016 several Mayors of the DBP were removed, the DBP Co-chair Tunnel invited the mayors to work on for the people from the parties buildings instead of the municipalities.

Political views 
She demands a further improvements for the cultural rights of the Kurdish population in Turkey and accused the AKP and the Kemalist Republican People's Party of stalling negotiations on the matter.

Recognition of Armenian genocide 
Sebahat Tuncel has made a number of statements for Turkey to recognize the Armenian genocide.In November 2014, she presented the Armenian Genocide Recognition Bill in the Turkish parliament, urging the Turkish President Recep Tayyip Erdoğan to publicly apologize for the Armenian Genocide.

Prosecution and imprisonment 
On 4 October 2016 she was taken into custody and arrested in November 2016. According to the International Law Bureau the prosecution demanded 130 years of imprisonment for terror related charges due to her membership in the legal party DTP and 16 statements and speeches she made during meetings and press conferences she held before meetings of the DBP. On 5 January 2018 she was sentenced to 2 years and three months in prison. In January 2019 she joined and ongoing hunger strike of Leyla Güven demanding the end of the isolation of Abdullah Öcalan. In February 2019, while still in hunger strike, she was sentenced to 15 years in prison for being a member of a terrorist organization and making propaganda for a terrorist organization. In October 2020, she was included into investigations into the Kobanî protests of 2014. 

In September 2020, another sentence under the controversial Article 299 of Turkey's penal code over 11 months followed for insulting the Turkish president Recep Tayyip Erdoğan. The sentence was given for calling Erdoğan an "enemy of women" in a speech in 2016. She had made this statement after two controversial statements of Erdoğan where in 2014 he had publicly said "women are not equal to men" and in 2016 he said "women who reject motherhood are deficient and incomplete". On 17 March 2021, the state prosecutor Bekir Şahin demanded for Tuncel and 686 other HDP politicians a five-year ban to engage in politics together with a closure of the HDP due to the parties alleged organizational unity with the PKK.

References 

 

1975 births
Living people
People from Yazıhan
Turkish Kurdish women
Turkish Kurdish politicians
21st-century Kurdish women politicians
Kurdish activists
Kurdish women activists
Kurdish Alevis
Democratic Society Party politicians
Democratic Regions Party politicians
Leaders of the Peoples' Democratic Party (Turkey)
Deputies of Istanbul
Members of the 24th Parliament of Turkey
Members of the 23rd Parliament of Turkey
Female party leaders of Turkey
Kurdish politicians
Turkish prisoners and detainees
Politicians arrested in Turkey
People's Democracy Party politicians
21st-century Turkish women politicians
21st-century Turkish politicians
Kurdish women's rights activists
Political prisoners in Turkey